Animal Planet was an Italian television channel broadcasting programmes about animals. All content is adapted for an Italian audience. The channel closed down on January 31, 2019.

The channel launched on May 1, 2005, exclusively available on Sky Italia. It was the fifth channel launched by Discovery Networks in Italy after Discovery Channel, Discovery Science, Discovery Civilisation and Discovery Travel & Adventure.

In October 2008, the channel adopted a new logo and a new look, previously adopted by the channel's American counterpart.

Animal Planet closed in Italy on 1 February 2019.

In April 2019, its content became available on Dplay and adopted a new logo.

References

Defunct television channels in Italy
Italy
Television channels and stations established in 2005
Television channels and stations disestablished in 2019
Italian-language television stations
2005 establishments in Italy